Lectionary 322 (Gregory-Aland), designated by siglum ℓ 322 (in the Gregory-Aland numbering) is a Greek manuscript of the New Testament, on parchment. Palaeographically it has been assigned to the 11th-century. The manuscript has survived in complete condition.

Description 

The original codex contained lessons from the Gospel of John and Matthew (Evangelistarium), on 79 parchment leaves. The leaves are measured.

The text is written in Greek minuscule letters, in two columns per page, 24 lines per page. It has musical notes.

History 

Scrivener dated the manuscript to the 13th-century, Gregory dated it to the 11th-century. It is presently assigned by the INTF to the 11th-century.

It was purchased from Spyridon P. Lambros from Athens, on 26 March 1859 (along with lectionaries 321, 323, and 324).

The manuscript was added to the list of New Testament manuscripts by Scrivener (270e) and Gregory (number 322e). Gregory saw it in 1883.

The manuscript was mentioned by Catalogue of Additions to the Manuscripts in the British Museum, 1854-1875, by M. Richard.

Currently the codex is housed at the British Library (Add MS 22742) in London.

The fragment is not cited in critical editions of the Greek New Testament (UBS4, NA28).

See also 

 List of New Testament lectionaries
 Biblical manuscript
 Textual criticism
 Lectionary 320

Notes and references

Bibliography

External links 
 Add MS 22742 Digitised Manuscripts

Greek New Testament lectionaries
11th-century biblical manuscripts
British Library additional manuscripts